Harpsden Wood is a  biological Site of Special Scientific Interest south of Henley-on-Thames in Oxfordshire. It is owned by the Woodland Trust and is open to the public.

Most of this ancient wood is on acidic clay with flints, although some areas are on sandy clay or chalky silt. The acid soils have a sparse understorey but there is a diverse ground flora in the calcareous areas. Orchids include  broad-leaved helleborine, green-flowered helleborine, bird's-nest orchid and narrow-lipped helleborine.

References

 
Sites of Special Scientific Interest in Oxfordshire